The 103rd Expeditionary Sustainment Command (ESC) is a subordinate command of 377th Theater Sustainment Command (United States). The 103rd Sustainment Command (Expeditionary) is located on the Fort Des Moines Joint Reserve Complex in Des Moines, Iowa. The command comprises 62 subordinate units and has command and control of almost 6,000 Army Reserve Soldiers throughout the midwestern United States to include locations in Iowa, Minnesota, Wisconsin, Michigan and Illinois. The 103rd Sustainment Command (Expeditionary) provides trained and ready forces in support of global contingency operations. On order, the 103rd ESC is prepared to deploy and provide command and control to all assigned, attached, and operationally controlled units and will provide sustainment planning, guidance and support to forces in the area of operations.

Subordinate units 

As of 2018 the following units are subordinated to the 103rd Sustainment Command (Expeditionary):

 103rd Sustainment Command (Expeditionary) (103rd ESC), in Des Moines, Iowa
 206th Regional Support Group (206th RSG), in Springfield, Illinois
 644th Regional Support Group (644th RSG), in Fort Snelling, Minnesota
 645th Regional Support Group (645th RSG), in Southfield, Michigan
 646th Regional Support Group (646th RSG), in Cedar Rapids, Iowa
 649th Regional Support Group (649th RSG), in Madison, Wisconsin

History 
The 103rd Expeditionary Sustainment Command initially formed as the 103rd Infantry Division (United States), organized as a reserve division on 9 September 1921, in Denver, Colorado. It was ordered into active service on 15 November 1942 at Camp Claiborne, Louisiana.

The 103rd Infantry Division was activated as a reserve division on 7 May 1947 in Des Moines, Iowa. In February 1963, its combat elements were redesignated and reorganized as the 205th Infantry Brigade and the 103rd Operational Headquarters. In June of that year, that headquarters was redesignated 103rd Command Headquarters (Divisional). In December 1965, it was reorganized as the 103rd Support Brigade.

The 103rd Support Brigade was redesignated and reorganized as the 103rd Corps Support Command (COSCOM) in September 1977. The 103rd COSCOM was the first corps support command in the U.S. Army Reserve.

On 15 September 1993, the 103rd COSCOM inactivated. Out of the inactivation of the 103rd COSCOM was the birth of two new reserve units: the 19th Theater Army Area Command (CONUS) and the 3rd COSCOM (CONUS).

On 14 February 2006 the 103rd was redesignated as Headquarters and Headquarters Company, 103rd Expeditionary Sustainment Command. The 103rd Expeditionary Sustainment Command re-activated as a reserve command effective 16 September 2006.

Although the division was officially relocated to the Iowa and Minnesota area in 1947, its Cactus Patch still reflects the unit's original geographic locations. The 103rd has transformed from an infantry division, to a support brigade, to a corps support command, to an Expeditionary Sustainment Command.

Operation Iraqi Freedom 
In April 2010, the 103rd ESC deployed to Iraq in support of operations Iraqi Freedom and New Dawn and provided logistics and support to forces throughout the country.
103rd ESC's first deployment as an expeditionary sustainment command. The 103rd ESC's mission in Iraq was to reduce the footprint of the U.S. military presence in Iraq by providing logistical support and assistance with the responsible drawdown of equipment while simultaneously sustaining troops in theater. More than half the soldiers currently assigned to the 103rd ESC have been deployed previously to Iraq or Afghanistan with different units in support of other missions.

Operation Enduring Freedom 
On 16 June 2013, Soldiers from the 103rd ESC were deployed to Afghanistan in support of Operation Enduring Freedom (OEF) and provide Combat Service Support capabilities within Regional Command East (RC East) and Regional Command North (RC North), in support of Operation Enduring Freedom. The deployed Soldiers came from the 203rd Transportation Company (Inland) to participate in this deployment as the 203rd Inland Cargo Transportation Company.

Unit Insignia

Shoulder Sleeve Insignia (SSI) 
On a yellow disc  in diameter, a blue horizontal base, overall a green giant cactus, all with a  Army green border. The cactus represents the home area of the unit in the Southwest when it was first organized and is symbolic of the unit's nickname.

The shoulder sleeve insignia was originally approved for the 103d Division on 14 October 1922 and the approval specified the segment at the bottom of the disc to be the color of the branch of service. On 18 June 1935, the authorization was amended to standardize the design with the segment at the bottom of the disc to be blue. It was redesignated for the 103rd Command Headquarters (Divisional) on 23 October 1963. It was redesignated for the 103rd Support Command on 29 March 1978. The insignia was redesignated effective 16 September 1993, for the 103rd Infantry Division. It was redesignated effective 16 September 2006, for the 103rd Expeditionary Sustainment Command and updated to add a symbolism.

Distinctive Unit Insignia (DUI) 
A gold color metal and enamel device  in height overall consisting of a gold heraldic millrind supporting a gold arrow, point up, and bearing upon its crossbar a blue fleur-de-lis between two blue five pointed stars; all upon a scarlet field and above a blue concave scroll, with ends white and folded vertically terminating at the outer edge of the crossbar, inscribed on the blue portion "WE SUCCEED" and on the white portion a cactus on the left side and a Yale key on the right, both vertical and gold.

Buff (gold) and scarlet are the colors associated with US Army Support units. The millrind is symbolic of strength and support; the stars denote military leadership and the arrow suggests combat readiness. The cactus refers to the unit's early history as the Cactus Division and the key to its later redesignation to a Support Brigade. The fleur-de-lis and two stars represent World War II combat service in the Rhineland, Ardennes-Alsace and Central Europe campaigns. The colors blue, white and scarlet also refer to the flag of Iowa, location of the unit's headquarters.

The distinctive unit insignia was originally approved for the 103d Support Command (Corps) on 10 August 1982. It was redesignated effective 16 September 2006, for the 103d Sustainment Command with the description updated.

Combat Service Identification Badge (CSIB)

A gold color metal and enamel device  in diameter consisting of a design similar to the shoulder sleeve insignia.

References

External links 
 103rd Sustainment Command (Expeditionary) Home Page
 The Institute of Heraldry
The Cactus Patch: The official magazine for the 103rd Expeditionary Sustainment Command

Further reading 

Military units and formations of the United States Army Reserve
103